Eunos may refer to:

 Eunos (automobile), a brand of vehicles made by Mazda
 Eunos Group Representation Constituency, a defunct GRC ward in Singapore
 Eunos MRT station, an above-ground Mass Rapid Transit station in Singapore
 The alternative name for Geylang East, a subzone of the town of Geylang in Singapore
 Jalan Eunos, a local street in Geylang East